is a shoot 'em up arcade game developed by G.rev and Gulti. The game was released for arcade in Japan on July 30, 2008. Mamorukun Curse! was later ported and released for the Xbox 360 in Japan on June 25, 2009. An enhanced port of game was released exclusively for the PlayStation 3 in Japan on March 31, 2011, offering full high-definition widescreen support with two Xbox 360 DLC characters included for free, and a new "Meikai Katsugeki" mode. UFO Interactive Games localized and released the PS3 version as a digital download on July 16, 2013. Sony made this version available to play on additional platforms through its PlayStation Now streaming service on March 17, 2015.

Gameplay 
The game puts the player in control of Mamoru in an overhead shooter. Different from most shooters, the scrolling is not forced. The player is able to move about as they please, although most movements end up being up and down.

The "curse" part of the title comes from a special "curse bomb" attack which uses a separate button from the standard shot. These bombs can be used both to destroy the enemies' bullets, and to "curse" them, making them more powerful but opening up chances for a higher score.

Notes

References

External links 

Arcade video games
2008 video games
PlayStation 3 games
Video games developed in Japan
Video games scored by Yousuke Yasui
Xbox 360 games
UFO Interactive Games games
G.rev games
CyberFront games